Unforgettable is a four-piece set celebrating the life of the late Tejano singer Selena, released in promotion for the tribute concert Selena ¡VIVE! The set consisted of two albums, which were released on the same day as separate discs: Unforgettable: The Live Album and Unforgettable: The Studio Album.

A week later, on April 5, 2005, Unforgettable: Limited Edition was released, which combined the studio and live album with two DVDs.

Track listings and information

Unforgettable: The Live Album
Unforgettable - The Live Album is a collection of Selena's greatest hits performed in concert and compiled for previously released live albums. It was released on March 29, 2005, peaking at number 26 on the Latin Album Chart. Many fans were disappointed when "No Debes Jugar" and "La Llamada" were not released live.

 Como La Flor (from Selena Live!)
 Amor Prohibido (from Live! The Last Concert)
 Baila Esta Cumbia (from Live! The Last Concert)
 Ya Ves (from Selena Live!)
 Las Cadenas (from Selena Live!)
 Yo Te Amo (from Selena Live!)
 Tus Desprecios (from Live! The Last Concert)
 Cobarde (from Live! The Last Concert)
 Si La Quieres (from Selena Live!)
 El Chico Del Apartamento 512 (from Live! The Last Concert)
 Bidi Bidi Bom Bom (from Live! The Last Concert)
 Si Una Vez (from Live! The Last Concert)
 Que Creias (from Selena Live!)
 No Me Queda Mas (from Live! The Last Concert)
 Como La Flor (from Live! The Last Concert)
 No Debes Jugar
 La Llamada

Unforgettable: The Studio Album

Unforgettable - The Studio Album is a collection of Selena's greatest hits. It was released on March 29, 2005, peaking at number 17 on the Latin Album Chart, and was later certified Gold.

 Como La Flor
 La Carcacha
 No Debes Jugar
 La Llamada
 Amor Prohibido
 No Me Queda Mas
 Fotos Y Recuerdos
 El Chico Del Apartamento 512
 Bidi Bidi Bom Bom
 Techno Cumbia
 Si Una Vez
 Tu, Solo Tu
 I Could Fall In Love
 Dreaming Of You
 Puede Ser
 No Quiero Saber
 Baila Esta Cumbia

Unforgettable: Limited Edition 

 Disc 3 - Selena Videos
 No Quiero Saber
 La Carcacha
 Buenos Amigos
 La Llamada
 Amor Prohibido
 No Me Queda Más
 Bidi Bidi Bom Bom
 Techno Cumbia
 Donde Quiera Que Estés
 Tú, Sólo Tú
 Siempre Hece Frío
 I Could Fall in Love
 Dreaming of You

 Disc 4 - Selena Remembered
 Music Legend
 Beginning
 Tejano Superstar
 Label Deal
 Evolution
 Entre a Mi Mundo
 Breakthrough
 Amor Prohibido
 Selena's World
 Dreaming of You

Charts 
Unforgettable: The Studio Album

Unforgettable: The Live Album

Unforgettable: The Special Edition

Certifications

References 

2005 greatest hits albums
2005 live albums
Selena compilation albums
Selena live albums
Compilation albums published posthumously
Live albums published posthumously
Albums recorded at Q-Productions